John Samuel "Jack" Marshall (21 March 1926 – 6 March 2013) was a rugby union player who represented Australia.

Marshall, a wing, was born in Belmont, New South Wales and claimed 1 international rugby cap for Australia.

References

Australian rugby union players
Australia international rugby union players
1926 births
2013 deaths
Rugby union players from Newcastle, New South Wales
Rugby union wings